Younis Eyal Slman (born 9 May 1993) is a Jordanian judoka who competes in the under 73kg category.

Selected to compete at the delayed 2020 Summer Games in Tokyo, he was drawn in his first match against Bilal Çiloğlu who defeated him with ippon.

References

1993 births
Living people
Jordanian male judoka
Olympic judoka of Jordan
Judoka at the 2020 Summer Olympics
Place of birth missing (living people)
21st-century Jordanian people